Since 1977, female jockeys have been allowed in the Grand National horse race following the passing of the Sex Discrimination Act 1975. A total of 19 female jockeys have entered the Grand National since then. Charlotte Brew on her horse, Barony Fort, was the first woman to compete in the race, in 1977. In 1982 Geraldine Rees became the first woman to complete the course. She rode Cheers to eighth place. That time, Brew returned with her horse Martinstown; this was the first Grand National with two female jockeys entering.

In 1988, female participation was at an all-time high, as three women entered for the first time. Penny Ffitch-Heyes, Venetia Williams and Gee Armytage all started the race. None of their horses made the finish. In 2005, after an absence of 11 years, there was once again a woman entering the Grand National. Carrie Ford finished in fifth, then the joint-best performance by a woman. She shared the record with Rosemary Henderson, the last female jockey to start the race.

In 2012, the first female jockey to finish in the top three was Katie Walsh on Seabass. Nina Carberry and Katie Walsh both started six Grand Nationals, a joint record for a woman. In 2021, Rachael Blackmore, riding Minella Times, became the first female jockey to win the race.

Female jockeys

References

External links

Grand National
Lists of women by occupation